By the 18th century almost all Ukrainians had family names. Most Ukrainian surnames (and surnames in Slavic languages in general) are formed by adding possessive and other suffixes to given names, place names, professions and other words. 

Surnames were developed for official documents or business record keeping to differentiate the parties who might have the same first name.  By the 15th century, surnames were used by the upper class, nobles and large land owners. In cities and towns, surnames became necessary in the 15th and 16th centuries. In 1632, Orthodox Metropolitan Petro Mohyla ordered priests to include a surname in all records of birth, marriage and death.

After the partitions of Poland (1772–1795), Western Ukraine came under the Austrian Empire, where peasants needed surnames for taxation purposes and military service and churches were required to keep records of all births, deaths and marriages.

The surnames with the suffix -enko are the most known and common Ukrainian surnames. Due to migration and many deportations of Ukrainians in history, it's also present in Belarus and Russia, especially in the Kuban region, where many ethnic Ukrainians historically lived.

Suffixes 
Common suffixes in Ukrainian names are:
  (Шевченко, Гордієнко, Коваленко, Зінченко, Симоненко, Кравченко, Войтенко, Ткаченко), distinctively Ukrainian, first recorded in the 15th century. 
The suffixes  are considered to be patronymic. 
  (Панчишин, Костишин, Романишин). Such suffixes are simply added to Ukrainian given names.
  (Тарновський, Зеленський), originally from aristocratic usage but then generalized. Common in Western Ukraine.
  (Шухевич, Петрушевич, Андрушевич, Шушкевич, Горлукович).
 , a diminutive ending often with patronymic meaning (Сірко, Павличко, Бойко). 

Some names have differing masculine and feminine forms, meaning a brother and sister's surname will be inflected with different suffixes (such as Zelenskyi/Зеленський vs. Zelenska/Зеленська). Others (such as the distinctively Ukrainian names ending in ) do not change with grammatical gender.

First elements 
The first elements of Ukrainian surnames are most commonly given names (patronymics and matronymics), place names (toponyms), and professions. 

Patronymic surnames 

From the first name Ivan (John in English), over 100 different surnames can be formed. The most common variations of Ivan in Ukrainian are Ivas, Jan, Vakhno, and Vanko.  The surnames based on Ivan include: Ivaniv, Ivankiv, Ivasiv, Ivashchenko, Ivankhiv, Janiv, Jankiv, and Ivaniuk.  More examples of surnames based on a first name: 
 Andrii (Andrew): Andriiash, Andriiets, Andrusyshyn and Andrukhovych
 Hryhorii (Gregory): Hryniuk, Hryniv, Hryhoruk
 Mykhailo (Michael): Mykhailuk
 Pavlo (Paul): Pavlovych, Pavliuk, Pailiuk, Pavluk
 Stepan (Steven): Stefaniuk, Stefanyk
When a woman married, she was known by a form of her husband's first name or her father's. From the name Petro, she was Petrykha, (wife of Petro). Petryshyn came from Petrykha, Romanyshyn from Romanykha and Ivanyshyn from Ivanykha. Surnames based on women's names are rare (Marunchak from Marunia, a form of Maria).

Toponymic surnames 

Some Ukrainian toponymic surnames can be identified as from the Galicia region.

Profession-based surnames 
 Bondar (Bodnar, Bondaruk) — barrel maker, cooper 
 Honchar (Honcharenko, Honcharuk) — potter, ceramist
 Kolisnyk (Kolisnychenko) — wheelwright
 Kravets (Kravchenko, Kravchuk) — tailor
 Kushnir (Kushnirenko, Kushniruk) — furrier
 Oliinyk — vegetable oil-manufacturer
 Ponomarenko (Ponomarchuk) – clergyman
 Skliar — glazier
 Chumak — salt-trader
Ethnic surnames 

Names that show ethnic, national or tribal origins other than Ukrainian. 
   Nimchuk, from Germany ( means German in Ukrainian).
   Tataryn, from Tatar, the Turkic people of the "Golden Horde".
   Voloshyn, from Volokh, an ancient tribe that originally lived in Romania and Moldova.

Cossack names 
There are also old Cossack names that derive from military occupations, such as Kompaniiets or Kompanichenko. There are also surnames derived from monikers based on personal characteristics. These compounds, usually consisting of a second person-singular-addressed imperative verb or an adjective coupled with a noun, can often be somewhat comical such as:

Such surnames are primarily derived from a funny memorable situation or a phrase coined by the person, who eventually received such a name, and supposedly originated in the 15th–16th centuries with the start of the Cossack movement. 

Among Cossacks were also much simplified nature-derived last names such as Hohol (topknot), Orel (eagle), Bakai/Bakay/Bakaj (pothole), Horobets (sparrow), Syromakha (orphan), Rosomakha (wolverine), Vedmid' (bear), Moroz (frost), Kulish (Cossack soup), Mara (wraith), Skovoroda (frying pan), Harbuz (pumpkin), Vovk (wolf), Chaika (seagull) and many more that are common nouns of the Ukrainian language. Other Cossack last names were based on personality characteristics, e.g. Babii (womanizer), Dovhopiat (long foot), Dryhalo (twitchy person), Nudylo (tedious person), Plaksa (crying person), Pribluda (fornicate child, bastard), Prilipko (sticky person), Sverbylo (itchy person), Vereshchaka (shrieking person), Vytrishchaka (goggling person), etc.

See also 
 List of surnames in Ukraine
 Ukrainian names
 Slavic names
 Slavic surnames

Notes

External links
 List of 10,000 most popular surnames in Ukraine